Fray Justo Santa María de Oro is the most south western department of Chaco Province in Argentina.

The provincial subdivision has a population of about 10,500 inhabitants in an area of 2,205 km², and its capital city is Santa Sylvina, which is located around 1,000 km from the Capital federal.

It takes its name from Justo de Santa María de Oro.

Settlements
Cabeza del Tigre
Chorotis
Santa Sylvina
Tres Mojones
Venados Grandes
Zuberbuhler

References

Departments of Chaco Province